Lin Haifeng may refer to:

Rin Kaiho (born 1942), Taiwanese Go player
Lamb Hoi Fong (born 1967), Hong Kong singer and actor